Rokeby is a town in West Gippsland, Victoria, Australia.

Rokeby Post Office opened on 20 May 1892 and closed in 1981.

References

External links

Towns in Victoria (Australia)
Shire of Baw Baw